Filip Mitrovic (born October 31, 1991, Kraljevo) is a Serbian pop singer. Before becoming a singer, he was a pizza master.

Debut 
The public was introduced to Filip through the talent show Prvi glas Srbije (season 1) which was aired on Prva Srpska Televizija where he won the fifth place. A year after the expiry of the contract, he signed a new contract and became part of Grand Production, the largest production company in the Balkan.

Discography 
For Grand Production he published a song Šta sam ti ja, a duet with a Serbian folk singer Biljana Sečivanović.

A few months later he was invited to participate in a reality show Farma which was broadcast on RTV Pink. In this reality, he stayed 95 days and then he presented his first single Ljubavni parazit which quickly became a hit on TV and radio stations.

Soon he presented the songs:
 Antidepresiv (2013)
 Luda Glava (2013)
 Brojim (2014)
 Beli grad (2014)
 Ludo Srce (2015)
 Zabranjeno moje (2016)
 Ne pričam nikom o tebi (2017)

In October 2017. Filip released his first album `Virus`.

Filip is collaborating with the best composers and arrangers in Serbia such as Bojan Vasic and Marko Cvetković, who also wrote for some of the biggest Balkan stars such as Saša Matić, Ceca, Aca Lukas  and many others.

He is the first Serbian singer who shot music videos on Iceland, which has attracted significant media attention since it is the destination of a few Justin Bieber's videos. His music video Zabranjeno moje won the award for the music video of the year.

References 

 
 Filip Mitrovic iskopirao Justin Bieber-a
 Filip Mitrovic ulazi na Farmu
 Filip Mitrovic najavio prvu pesmu
  Filip Mitrovic dobio nagradu za spot godine

Living people
1991 births
Serbian pop singers
21st-century Serbian male singers